Leedsichthys is an extinct genus of pachycormid fish that lived in the oceans of the Middle to Late Jurassic. It is the largest ray-finned fish, and amongst the largest fish known to have ever existed.

The first remains of Leedsichthys were identified in the nineteenth century. Especially important were the finds by the British collector Alfred Nicholson Leeds, after whom the genus was named "Leeds' fish" in 1889. The type species is Leedsichthys problematicus. Leedsichthys fossils have been found in England, France, Germany and Chile. In 1999, based on the Chilean discoveries, a second species was named Leedsichthys notocetes, but this was later shown to be indistinguishable from L. problematicus.

Leedsichthys fossils have been difficult to interpret because the skeletons were not completely made of bone. Large parts consisted of cartilage that did not fossilize. On several occasions the enigmatic large partial remains have been mistaken for stegosaurian dinosaur bones. As the vertebrae are among the parts that have not been preserved, it is hard to determine the total body length. Estimates have varied significantly. Skull bones have been found indicating that Leedsichthys had a large head with bosses on the skull roof. Fossilised bony fin rays show large elongated pectoral fins and a tall vertical tail fin. The gill arches were lined by gill rakers, equipped by a unique system of delicate bone plates, that filtered plankton from the sea water, the main food source.

Along with its close pachycormid relatives Bonnerichthys and Rhinconichthys, Leedsichthys is part of a lineage of large-sized filter-feeders that swam the Mesozoic seas for over 100 million years, from the middle Jurassic until the end of the Cretaceous period. Pachycormids might represent an early branch of Teleostei, the group most modern bony fishes belong to; in that case Leedsichthys is the largest known teleost fish.

Discovery and naming
During the 1880s, the gentleman farmer Alfred Nicholson Leeds collected large fish fossils from loam pits near Peterborough, England. In May 1886 these were inspected by John Whitaker Hulke, who in 1887 partially reported them as the back plates of the stegosaurian Omosaurus. On 22 August 1888, the American dinosaur expert Professor Othniel Charles Marsh visited Leeds' farm at Eyebury and quickly concluded that the presumed dinosaurian armour in fact represented the skull bones of a giant fish. Within two weeks British fish expert Arthur Smith Woodward examined the specimens and began to prepare a formal description published in 1889. In it he named the species Leedsichthys problematicus. The generic name Leedsichthys means "Leeds' fish", from Greek ἰχθύς, ichthys, "fish". The fossils found by Leeds gave the fish the specific epithet problematicus because the remains were so fragmented that they were extremely hard to recognize and interpret. After a second publication in 1889, objections were raised against the perceived "barbaric" nature of the generic name, which simply attached a non-Latinised British family name to a Classical Greek word. Woodward therefore in 1890 changed the genus name to Leedsia, resulting in a Leedsia problematica. However, by modern standards this is a non-valid junior synonym.

The holotype specimen, BMNH P.6921, had been found in a layer of the Oxford Clay Formation dating from the Callovian, about 165 million years old. It consists of 1133 disarticulated elements of the skeleton, mostly fin ray fragments, probably of a single individual. Another specimen, BMNH P.6922, contains additional probable fragmentary remains of Leedsichthys. Woodward also identified a specimen previously acquired from the French collector Tesson, who had in 1857 found them in the Falaises des Vaches Noires of Normandy, BMNH 32581, as the gill rakers of Leedsichthys. Another specimen bought in 1875 from the collection of William Cunnington, BMNH 46355, he failed to recognise.

Leeds continued to collect Leedsichthys fossils that subsequently were acquired by British musea. In March 1898, Leeds reported to have discovered a tail which he on 17 March 1899 sold for £25 to the British Museum of Natural History, which exhibited it as specimen BMNH P.10000; a new inventory number range was begun for the occasion. Already in July 1898, the front of probably the same animal had been bought, BMNH P.11823. On 22 July 1905 specimen BMNH P.10156 was acquired, a gill basket. In January 1915 Leeds sold specimens GLAHM V3362, a pectoral fin, and GLAHM V3363, the remainder of the same skeleton with 904 elements, to the Hunterian Museum of Glasgow.

Leeds had a rival, the collector Henry Keeping, who in 1899 tricked pit workers into selling dorsal fin rays by misinforming them that Leeds had lost interest in such finds. Keeping again sold these to the University of Cambridge where they were catalogued as specimen CAMSM J.46873. In September 1901, they were examined by the German palaeontologist Friedrich von Huene, who identified them as tail spikes, Schwanzstacheln, of Omosaurus, the second time Leedsichthys remains were mistaken for stegosaurian bones; Leeds himself was able to disabuse von Huene the same year.

In 2001, students at the Dogsthorpe Star Pit discovered a major new British specimen that they nicknamed "Ariston" after a 1991 commercial for the Indesit Ariston washing machine that claimed it went "on and on and on" — likewise the bones of Leedsichthys seemed to endlessly continue into the face of the loam pit. From 2002 until 2004 "Ariston" or specimen PETMG F174 was excavated by a team headed by Jeff Liston; to uncover the remains it was necessary to remove ten thousand tonnes of loam forming an overburden of  thickness. The find generated considerable media attention, inspiring an episode of the BBC Sea Monsters series, "The Second Most Deadly Sea", and a Channel Four documentary titled The Big Monster Dig, both containing computer-generated animated reconstructions of Leedsichthys. Liston subsequently dedicated a dissertation and a series of articles to Leedsichthys, providing the first extensive modern osteology of the animal.

Apart from the British discoveries, finds of a more fragmentary nature continued to be made in Normandy, France. In July 1982, Germany became an important source of Leedsichthys fossils when two groups of amateur palaeontologists, unaware of each other's activities, began to dig up the same skeleton at Wallücke. Remarkably, parts of it were again incorrectly identified as stegosaurian material, of Lexovisaurus. From 1973 onwards, fragmentary Leedsichthys fossils were uncovered in Chile. In March 1994, a more complete specimen was found, SMNK 2573 PAL. In 1999 the Chilean finds were named as a second species, Leedsichthys notocetes, the "Southern Sea Monster". However, Liston later concluded that the presumed distinguishing traits of this species, depressions on the gill rakers, were artefacts caused by erosion; Leedsichthys notocetes would be a junior synonym of Leedsichthys problematicus.

Fossil range
The fossil remains of Leedsichthys have been found in the Callovian of England and northern Germany, the Oxfordian of Chile, and the Callovian and upper Kimmeridgian of France. These occurrences span a temporal range of at least five million years. A complete and isolated gill raker from the Vaca Muerta formation of Argentina (MOZ-Pv 1788), has been assigned to the genus and dates to the early Tithonian.

Description

Although the remains of over seventy individuals have been found, most of them are partial and fragmentary. The skeleton of Leedsichthys is thus only imperfectly known. This is largely caused by the fact that many skeletal elements, including the front of the skull and the vertebral centra, did not ossify but remained cartilage. Furthermore, those that did ossify were gradually hollowed out during the lifetime of the animal by resorption of the inner bone tissue. In the fossil phase, compression flattened and cracked these hollow structures, making it extraordinarily difficult to identify them or determine their original form.

The head was probably relatively large and wide but still elongated. The snout is completely unknown. Frontal bones are absent. The skull roof is rather robust with bosses on the parietals, continuing sideways over the dermopterotica, and the postparietals. The parietals have a notch on the front midline. A dermosphenoticum is present above the eye socket. The jaws are toothless. Behind the jaw joint a robust hyomandibula is present. The gill basket rests on paired hypohyalia. At least the first two gill arches have ossified hypobranchialia, the lower parts of the gill arch; a third hypobranchiale was likely present. The hypobranchials are attached at their lower ends at an angle of 21,5° via a functional joint that possibly served to increase the gape of the mouth, to about two feet. All five gill arches have ossified ceratobranchialia with a triangular cross-section, the middle sections of the arches. The hypobranchials are fused with their ceratobranchials. The fifth gill arch is fused with the front parts of the basket. Higher epibranchialia and pharyngobranchialia are present but poorly known. The fourth arches are supported by a midline fourth basibranchiale. An ossified operculum is present.

The gill arches are equipped with rows of parallel 3-to-12-centimetre-long (1.2-to-4.7-inch-long) gill rakers, in life probably attached to the ceratobranchials via soft tissue. On the top of each raker one or two rows of dozens of low "teeth" are present. When there are two rows, they are placed on the edges of the upper surface and separated by a deep trough, itself separated from an internal hollow space by a transverse septum. The teeth or "fimbriations" are obliquely directed towards the front and the top. They are grooved at their sides, the striations continuing over the sides of the raker. Detailed study of exquisitely preserved French specimens revealed to Liston that these teeth were, again via soft tissue, each attached to delicate 2-millimetre-long (0.08-inch-long) bony plates, structures that had never before been observed among living or extinct fishes. An earlier hypothesis that the striations would function as sockets for sharp "needle teeth", as with the basking shark, was hereby refuted. The rakers served to filter plankton, the main food supply of Leedsichthys, from the sea water.

Large parts of the Leedsichthys fossils consist of bony finrays. Leedsichthys has two pectoral fins that probably were located rather low on the body. They are large, very elongated — about five times longer than wide — and scythe-like, with a sudden kink at the lower end, curving 10° to the rear. Also a dorsal fin is present, although its position is unknown. Pelvic fins at the belly are lacking; also a pelvic plate is absent. However, there are indications for a small triangular anal fin. The vertical tail fin is very large and symmetrical with paired upper and lower lobes; there is a smaller lobe in the middle protruding between them. The rays are unsegmented lepidotrichia, resulting in a rather stiff structure. They are bifurcated at up to three splitting points along their length, so a proximally single ray may have eight distal ends. A row of bony supraneuralia is present behind the head, at each side of the vertebral column. Uroneuralia at the tail are unknown. No bony scales are present.

Size

Leedsichthys is the largest known member of the Osteichthyes or bony fishes. The largest extant non-tetrapodomorph bony fish is the ocean sunfish, Mola mola, being with a weight of up to two tonnes an order of magnitude smaller than Leedsichthys. The extant giant oarfish might rival Leedsichthys in length but is much thinner. The lack of a preserved vertebral column has made it difficult to estimate the exact length of Leedsichthys. However, in 1986, David Martill compared the bones of Leedsichthys to a pachycormid that he had recently discovered, Asthenocormus. The unusual proportions of that specimen gave a wide range of possible sizes. Martill considered the higher estimate as a plausible size of the largest individuals.

Liston in his studies concluded to much lower estimates. A linear extrapolation from the gill basket would be flawed because the gills grow disproportionally in size, having to increase their surface allometrically to ensure the oxygen supply of a body increasing in volume to the third power.

In 2013, Liston and colleagues estimated that the age of the five specimens (PETMG F174, NHMUK PV P10000, GLAHM V3363, NHMUK PV P6921 and NHMUK PV P10156) would have ranged between 19 and 40 years old.

Phylogeny
Woodward initially assigned Leedsichthys to the Acipenseroidea, considering it related to the sturgeon, having the large gill rakers and branching finrays in common. In 1905, he changed this to the Pachycormidae. The Pachycormidae have a somewhat uncertain position. Often they are considered very basal Teleostei — if so, Leedsichthys would be the largest known teleost — others see them as members of a Pachycormiformes forming the sister group of the Teleostei, and sometimes they are seen as even more basal Amiiformes. In the latter case the extant bowfin, Amia calva, would be the closest living relative of Leedsichthys.

Within the Pachycormidae, a cladistic analysis found Leedsichthys to be the sister species of Asthenocormus, their clade  being the sister group of Martillichthys.

This cladogram after Friedman et al. shows a possible position of Leedsichtys in the evolutionary tree.

Paleobiology

Like the largest fish today, the whale sharks and basking sharks, Leedsichthys problematicus derived its nutrition as a suspension feeder, using an array of specialised gill rakers lining its gill basket to extract zooplankton, small animals, from the water passing through its mouth and across its gills. It is less clear whether also phytoplankton, algae, were part of the diet. Leedsichthys could have been a ram feeder, making the water pass through its gills by swimming, but could also have actively pumped the water through the gill basket. In 2010, Liston suggested that fossilised furrows discovered in ancient sea floors in Switzerland and attributed to the activity of plesiosaurs, had in fact been made by Leedsichthys spouting water through its mouth to disturb and eat the benthos, the animals dwelling in the sea floor mud.

Much is still uncertain about the life cycle of Leedsichthys. Liston's 2013 study suggested a slow, nearly linear, growth. A French study in 1993 of its bone structure concluded however, that the metabolism was rather high. Also problematic is how Leedsichthys could increase its size quickly during the first year of its life. Teleostei typically lay relatively small eggs and this has been seen as an obstacle for them attaining giant sizes.

In 1986, Martill reported the presence of a tooth of the marine crocodile Metriorhynchus in a bone of Leedsichthys. The bone would have healed, a sign that the about 3-metre-long (10-foot-long) Metriorhynchus was actively hunting the much larger fish. However, in 2007 Liston concluded the bone tissue had not in fact healed and that this was probably a case of scavenging. An apex predator of the Oxford Clay seas large enough to attack Leedsichthys was the pliosaurid Liopleurodon.

In 1999 Martill suggested that a climate change at the end of the Callovian led to the extinction of Leedsichthys in the northern seas, the southern Ocean offering a last refuge during the Oxfordian. However, in 2010 Liston pointed out that Leedsichthys during the later Kimmeridgian was still present in the north, as testified by Normandian finds. Liston did nevertheless consider in 2007 that the lack of any vertebrate suspension feeders as large as  prior to the Callovian stage of the Mesozoicum might indicate that the Callovian had seen a marked change in productivity as regarded zooplankton populations. Indeed, further studies supported this, viewing Leedsichthys as the beginning of a long line of large (> in length) pachycormid suspension feeders that continued to flourish well into the Late Cretaceous, such as Bonnerichthys and Rhinconichthys, and emphasising the convergent evolutionary paths taken by pachycormids and baleen whales.

Recent studies have uncovered some estimations regarding metabolic rate and speed for Leedsichthys. Using data from living teleost fish as a comparison, scientists discovered that Leedsichthys could have cruised along at potential speeds of  while still maintaining oxygenation of its body tissues.

Footnotes

External links 

 For more on the Star Pit dig of 2002-2003 look here and also here where the dig was featured in the BBC-Open University series Fossil Detectives. 
 For a more accurate reconstruction of Leedsichthys visit Paleocreations. The artist went on to produce the most accurate reconstruction of Leedsichthys to date, which was used on 'Fossil Detectives' (see above).
 Article on Leedsichthys by Darren Naish.
 Profile of Leedsichthys problematicus from the BBC series Sea Monsters
"Biggest Fish Ever Found" Unearthed in U.K. National Geographic News. Published October 1, 2003.
 Picture of Leedsichthys problematicus
 Article on Leedsichthys from BBC news

Pachycormiformes
Prehistoric ray-finned fish genera
Callovian genus first appearances
Oxfordian life
Kimmeridgian life
Jurassic fish of Europe
Jurassic France
Fossils of France
Jurassic Germany
Fossils of Germany
Jurassic United Kingdom
Fossils of England
Prehistoric fish of South America
Jurassic Chile
Fossils of Chile
Fossil taxa described in 1889
Taxa named by Arthur Smith Woodward
Jurassic Argentina